Croatian Party of Rights Dr. Ante Starčević ( or HSP AS) was a nationalist political party in Croatia.

It was founded in 2009 by Ruža Tomašić and others as a splinter party from the Croatian Party of Rights. It is named after Ante Starčević (1823–1896). In 2011, they reported a membership of 20,000. They had limited electoral success in local elections, such as winning three seats in Vukovar city council in 2011.

In 2011, Croatian Party of Rights-Dr. Ante Starčević signed a pre-election coalition agreement with far right Croatian Pure Party of Rights. In the 2011 Croatian parliamentary election, their coalition won one parliamentary seat.

In late 2012, the party made a permanent coalition with the centre-right Croatian Democratic Union. This coalition won the Croatian European Parliament election in 2013 and party president Ruža Tomašić was the highest ranking candidate on the winning list by preferential vote. The party joined the European Conservatives and Reformists.

On 3 November 2014, the party's founder and first president, Ruža Tomašić, left the party.

The party dissolved in 2020.

Election history

Legislative
The following is a summary of the party's results in legislative elections for the Croatian Parliament. The "Total votes" and "Percentage" columns include sums of votes won by pre-election coalitions HSP AS had been part of. After preferential votes were introduced into the electoral system, the total votes column also includes the statistic of the sum of votes given to HSS candidates on the coalition lists. The "Total seats" column includes sums of seats won by HSP AS in election constituencies plus representatives of ethnic minorities affiliated with HSP AS.

European parliament

References

External links

2009 establishments in Croatia
2020 disestablishments in Croatia
Anti-Serbian sentiment
Conservative parties in Croatia
Croatian nationalist parties
Defunct nationalist parties in Croatia
European Conservatives and Reformists member parties
Eurosceptic parties in Croatia
National conservative parties
Political parties disestablished in 2020
Political parties established in 2009
Right-wing parties in Europe
Right-wing populism in Croatia